HipHopDX is an online magazine of hip hop music criticism and news. The website's current president and publisher is Sharath Cherian and the Head Of Content is Jerry L. Barrow. HipHopDX is the flagship publication of Cheri Media Group.

In September 2020, the website was acquired by Warner Music Group.

HipHopDX was nominated for "Best Hip Hop Online Site" at the 2012 BET Hip Hop Awards. On September 3, 2013, The Source named HipHopDX, number three on their 2013 Digital Power 30 list, which ranks websites that are the most popular in the hip hop industry.

Year-end awards
Source

MC/Rapper of the Year
2006: Lupe Fiasco
2007: André 3000 of OutKast
2008: Nas
2009: Raekwon
2010: Eminem
2011: Tech N9ne
2012: Kendrick Lamar
2013: Kendrick Lamar
2014: Big K.R.I.T.
2015: Kendrick Lamar
2016: Chance the Rapper
2017: Kendrick Lamar
2018: J. Cole

Album of the Year
2006: Lupe Fiasco's Food & Liquor by Lupe Fiasco
2007: Graduation by Kanye West
2008: I Pledge Allegiance to the Grind II by Killer Mike
2009: Only Built 4 Cuban Linx... Pt. II by Raekwon
2010: My Beautiful Dark Twisted Fantasy by Kanye West
2011: Section.80 by Kendrick Lamar
2012: Good Kid, M.A.A.D City by Kendrick Lamar
2013: Run the Jewels by Run the Jewels
2014: PRhyme by PRhyme
2015: To Pimp a Butterfly by Kendrick Lamar
2016: Coloring Book by Chance the Rapper
2017: DAMN. by Kendrick Lamar
2018: KOD by J. Cole

Producer of the Year
2006: will.i.am
2007: Polow da Don
2008: Black Milk
2009: No ID
2010: Kanye West
2011: Big K.R.I.T.
2012: The Alchemist
2013: Mike Will Made It
2014: DJ Mustard
2015: Metro Boomin
2016: Kaytranada
2017: Metro Boomin

Verse of the Year
2006: R.A. the Rugged Man on Jedi Mind Tricks' "Uncommon Valor: A Vietnam Story"
2007: André 3000 on OutKast's "Da Art of Storytellin' Pt. 4"
2008: Joe Budden on "Who?"
2009: Ghostface Killah on Raekwon's "Gihad"
2010: Nicki Minaj on Kanye West's "Monster"
2011: Kendrick Lamar on "HiiiPower"
2012: Killer Mike on "Reagan"
2013: Kendrick Lamar on Big Sean's "Control"
2014: Big K.R.I.T. on "Mt. Olympus"
2015: Drake on "Back to Back"
2016: Chance the Rapper on Kanye West's "Ultralight Beam"
2017: Eminem on "The Storm"
2018: Jay Rock on King's Dead

Mixtape of the Year
2008: The Bar Exam 2 by Royce da 5'9"
2009: So Far Gone by Drake
2010: K.R.I.T. Wuz Here by Big K.R.I.T.
2013: Acid Rap by Chance the Rapper
2014: Tha Tour Pt. 1 by Rich Gang
2015: It's Better This Way by Big K.R.I.T.
2016: Tabernacle: Trust the Shooter by Royce da 5’9

Rising Star of the Year
2007: Blu
2008: Wale
2009: Fashawn
2010: Yelawolf
2011: Action Bronson
2012: Joey Badass
2013: Chance the Rapper
2014: Vince Staples
2015: Fetty Wap

Non Hip Hop Album of the Year
2006: St. Elsewhere by Gnarls Barkley
2007: Back to Black by Amy Winehouse
2008: Seeing Sounds by N.E.R.D
2009: Love the Future by Chester French
2010: The Lady Killer by Cee Lo Green
2011: Nostalgia, Ultra by Frank Ocean
2012: Channel Orange by Frank Ocean
2013: The 20/20 Experience by Justin Timberlake
2014: Souled Out by Jhene Aiko
2015: Beauty Behind the Madness by The Weeknd

Slept On Album of the Year/Underrated Album of the Year
2007: Below the Heavens by Blu & Exile
2008: Johnson&Jonson by Johnson&Jonson
2009: Born and Raised by Cormega
2010: Nineteen Ninety Now by Celph Titled & Buckwild
2011: Dr. Lecter by Action Bronson
2012: Trophies by O.C. and Apollo Brown
2013: Czarface by Czarface
2014: Faces by Mac Miller
2015: The Good Fight by Oddisee
2016: Handshakes with Snakes by Apathy
2017: At What Cost'' by GoldLink

Comeback of the Year
2007: UGK
2008: Q-Tip
2009: Wu-Tang Clan
2010: Lloyd Banks
2011: Common
2012: Juicy J
2013: Mac Miller
2014: G-Unit
2015: Dr. Dre
2016: A Tribe Called Quest
2017: Jay-Z
2018: Meek Mill

Tour of the Year
2010: The Home & Home Tour by Jay-Z and Eminem
2011: Watch the Throne Tour by Jay-Z and Kanye West
2012: Club Paradise Tour by Drake

References

External links

American music websites
Hip hop magazines
Hip hop websites
Magazines established in 1999
Magazines published in Los Angeles
Music review websites
Online music magazines published in the United States
1999 establishments in California